Sarvey Sathyanarayana (born 4 April 1954) is an Indian politician. He is a former member of the Parliament of India who represented Malkajgiri constituency between 2009 and 2014, and Siddipet constituency between 2004 and 2009. He was inducted into Manmohan Singh's cabinet as Union minister of state for Transport in October 2012 until 2014.

Early life
Sarve Satyanarayana was born in Hyderabad to Laxmaiah and Mallamma. He gained his B.A. and LL.B. from Osmania University. He was a student union leader.

Career
He rendered about 13 years of Govt. service in SBH Compilation from 1972 to 1977; HMT, Hyderabad, from 1972 to 1978; and SAIL, Hyderabad, 1978–1985. He was a trade union leader for about 10,000 employees in SAIL, spread over 42 branches all over the country.

Political career
Sarve Satyanarayana was elected to Andhra Pradesh Legislative Assembly from 1985 to 1989, elected to the Lok Sabha from Siddipet (Lok Sabha Constituency) in 2004 and from Malkajgiri constituency in 2009.

Political career
He was the national spokesman of the Congress party. He is an Ex-Member of Parliament in the Lok Sabha.

He was appointed as MoS, Road Transport & Highways on 28 October 2012.

References

External links
 Profile
 Home Page on the Parliament of India's Website
www.nationwithraga.org

Indian National Congress politicians
Living people
India MPs 2004–2009
India MPs 2009–2014
Union Ministers from Telangana
Andhra Pradesh MLAs 1985–1989
1954 births
Lok Sabha members from Andhra Pradesh
People from Ranga Reddy district
Indian National Congress politicians from Andhra Pradesh